The 2008-09 season was the 13th edition of Europe's premier basketball tournament for women since it was rebranded to its current format. It was won once again for the third time in a row by Spartak Moscow after defeating 2003 champions UMMC Ekaterinburg and first time finalists Perfumerías Avenida Salamanca in the final four, which took place in the latter's court.

Regular season

Group A

Group B

Group C

Group D

Knockout stage

Eight finals

Quarter finals

Final four

References
  FIBA

    
2008–09